Dave McCracken is a British songwriter and music producer. He is well known for his production on Ian Brown from The Stone Roses solo albums, Golden Greats, Music of the Spheres and Solarized. He has also produced Vantage Point by dEUS, The Rifles' second album and programmed and played keyboards on Playing the Angel by Depeche Mode.

Engineering and production credits
 The Rills - "Aftertaste EP" (Producer)
 Sports Team - "Gulp! LP" (Writer)
 Pip Blom - "Boat LP" (Producer)
 Sports Team - "Winter Nets EP" (Producer & Mixer)
 Pip Blom - "Paycheck EP" (Producer & Mixer) / "Boat" (album)
 The Snuts - "Manhattan Project & Seasons" (Producer)
 Scissor Sisters - "Naked" Track (Producer & Writer)
 Jagga - "Way Home" Track (Producer & Writer)
 Sugababes - Forthcoming Tracks (Producer & Writer)
 K.Flay - "Sunburn" & Forthcoming Tracks (Producer & Writer)
 Florence and the Machine - "Bedroom Hymns" (Writer)
 Nicola Roberts - "Porcelain Heart" Track (Writer, Programmer & Musician)
 Alicia Keys - "I Come Apart" Track (Producer & Writer)
 Daniel Merriweather - Forthcoming Tracks (Producer & Writer)
 Sirens Sirens - Forthcoming Tracks (Producer & Writer)
 Hugo - "99 Problems" & "Old Tyme Religion" Forthcoming Tracks (Producer & Writer)
 Brandon Boyd - Forthcoming Tracks (Producer & Writer)
 I Blame Coco - The Constant Album Tracks (Producer & Writer)
 Oh Land - Oh Land Album (Producer & Writer)
 Augustana - Forthcoming Tracks (Producer & Writer)
 Shakira - "Gypsy" Track (Producer & Writer)
 John Legend - "Fading" Track (Producer & Writer)
 Mr Hudson - “Time” Album Track (Producer)
 Brandy - Forthcoming Tracks (Producer & Writer)
 Ian Brown - My Way Album (Producer & Writer)
 Natalie Imbruglia - Come to Life Album Tracks (Producer & Writer)
 Matisyahu - "For You" Single (Producer & Writer)
 Beyoncé	- “Disappear” Album Track (Co-Producer & Writer)
 Kelly Rowland - Forthcoming Tracks (Writer)
 Mr Hudson - "Supernova", "White Lies" Singles (Producer)
 Beyoncé	- "Satellites" Album Track (Co-Producer & Writer)
 dEUS - Vantage Point Album (Producer & Mixer)
 The Rifles - Great Escape Album (Produce)
 Natalie Imbruglia	- Glorious: The Singles 997–07 Album (Writer, Programmer & Keyboards)
 Mr Hudson and the Library - Tale of Two Cities Album Tracks (Producer & Mixer)
 The Cooper Temple Clause - "Head" from Make This Your Own Album (Producer)
 Depeche Mode - Playing the Angel Album (Programmer & Keyboards)
 Depeche Mode - Live 5.1 DVD (Mixer & Programmer)
 Depeche Mode - "I Feel Loved" (Remixer)
 Boy George - "Time Machine" Single (Writer)
 Amanda Ghost - Blood on the Line EP (Writer & Producer)
 Ian Brown - Solarized Album (Producer)
 Ian Brown - Music of the Spheres Album (Writer & Producer)
 Ian Brown - Golden Greats Album (Writer & Programmer)

References

Year of birth missing (living people)
Living people
English record producers